Island House is a Grade II listed building in Plympton, Devon, England. Standing at 4 Church Street, at the corner with Fore Street, Plympton's main street, it dates to the 18th century.

References

Grade II listed buildings in Devon
Buildings and structures in Plympton, Devon
18th-century establishments in England